Judith Eleri Phillips  (born 7 February 1959) has been Professor of Gerontology and Social Work at Swansea University since 2004.

She was educated at Pontypridd Girls' Grammar School, Aberystwyth University (BA, 1980), Jesus College, Oxford (MSc, 1983) and the University of East Anglia (PhD, 1989). She was a Lecturer in Social Work at the University of East Anglia from 1989 to 1993, and Professor of Social Gerontology at Keele University from 2001 to 2004. She has been Scientific Director of the Centre for Innovative Ageing and Director of the Research Institute for Applied Social Science at Swansea University since 2009.

She was made an OBE in 2013.

References

1959 births
Living people
Alumni of Aberystwyth University
Alumni of Jesus College, Oxford
Alumni of the University of East Anglia
Academics of the University of East Anglia
Academics of Keele University
Academics of Swansea University
Officers of the Order of the British Empire
Fellows of the Learned Society of Wales